Larry Smith, often known as "Legs" Larry Smith (born 18 January 1944) is an English drummer of the comedy satirical jazz group the Bonzo Dog Doo-Dah Band.

He was originally invited to join the group by Vivian Stanshall as a tuba player and tap dancer. As the drummer he was a core member of the band, and performed on their top five hit "I'm the Urban Spaceman" and on all subsequent recordings. The Bonzo Dog Doo-Dah Band appeared in the Beatles' 1967 TV film Magical Mystery Tour and also in the ground-breaking ITV television series Do Not Adjust Your Set, which featured future Monty Python members Eric Idle, Terry Jones and Michael Palin.

As a solo artist Smith also toured with Eric Clapton and Elton John. Smith was a close friend of ex-Beatle George Harrison for many years, and designed the cover for his Gone Troppo album (1982). He also sang the theme song of and appeared in the Harrison-backed film Bullshot (1983), a HandMade Films production. Harrison wrote and recorded a song about Smith called "His Name Is Legs (Ladies and Gentlemen)", released on his album Extra Texture (Read All About It) (1975). The recording features the vocal antics of "Legs" himself, who also tap-danced in Elton John's song "I Think I'm Going To Kill Myself" from the album Honky Château (1972). He is also featured in the song "Legs Larry at Television Centre" on John Cale's 1972 album The Academy in Peril, for which he provides the voice of a television director.

On 28 January 2006, with other surviving members of the Bonzo Dog Doo-Dah Band, Smith played a reunion concert at the London Astoria. A countrywide tour, which began in Ipswich and ended with two shows at the Shepherd's Bush Empire with Adrian Edmonson and Phill Jupitus, followed during November 2006. The Shepherd's Bush Empire shows were filmed for TV broadcast by the BBC and also released on DVD. A further sold-out concert at the London Astoria in June 2008 saw Smith perform with the Bonzo Dog Doo-Dah Band where his 'Mr Wonderful' stage persona was a highlight of the concert.

In March 2009, Smug Records released "Legs" Larry Smith's – 'Call Me, Adolf!', a five-track digital EP produced by Gus Dudgeon.

External links
Official Bonzo Dog Band 40th Anniversary Tour web site
The Bonzo Dog Doo-Dah Band by Ian Kitching

1944 births
Living people
English rock drummers
English comedy musicians
British surrealist artists
Tap dancers
musicians from Oxford
Bonzo Dog Doo-Dah Band members
Album-cover and concert-poster artists